Paulo Cândido Serafim da Cruz, commonly known as Lico, (born 26 December 1984) is a Brazilian football striker who currently Plays with Valletta F.C.

After playing with Esporte Clube Democrata, América Mineiro and Valeriodoce Esporte Clube in Brazil, he moved to Portugal in 2006, where after playing with Atlético Vadevez has played in the Portuguese Liga de Honra for C.D. Santa Clara and Moreirense F.C. In summer 2011 he signed with Macedonian side FK Vardar.

Achievements
FK Vardar
First Macedonian Football League: 1
Winner: 2011-12

References

External links
 

1984 births
Living people
Footballers from São Paulo (state)
Brazilian footballers
Brazilian expatriate footballers
Association football forwards
Esporte Clube Democrata players
C.D. Santa Clara players
Moreirense F.C. players
Expatriate footballers in Portugal
FK Vardar players
Expatriate footballers in North Macedonia